The Modern Jazz Quartet Plays No Sun in Venice (originally titled The Modern Jazz Quartet Plays One Never Knows: Original Film Score for "No Sun in Venice") is a soundtrack album by American jazz group the Modern Jazz Quartet featuring performances recorded in 1957 for Roger Vadim's No Sun in Venice and released on the Atlantic label.

Reception

The Allmusic review stated "The music is quite complex and disciplined, making this set of lesser interest to fans who prefer to hear Milt Jackson playing bebop-oriented blues. However the versatile group was perfect for this type of music and these thought-provoking performances reward repeated listenings".

Track listing
All compositions by John Lewis.
 "The Golden Striker" – 3:39   
 "One Never Knows" – 9:20   
 "The Rose Truc" – 4:55   
 "Cortege" – 7:24   
 "Venice" – 4:26   
 "Three Windows" – 6:43

Personnel
Milt Jackson – vibraphone
John Lewis – piano
Percy Heath – bass
Connie Kay – drums

References

Atlantic Records soundtracks
Modern Jazz Quartet albums
1957 soundtrack albums
Albums produced by Nesuhi Ertegun